Ashi Phuntsho Choden (1911–2003) was the Queen consort of Bhutan.

Early life
Ashi Phuntsho Choden was born in 1911 at Wangducholing Palace to Chumed Zhalgno, Dasho Jamyang (of the Tamzhing Choji family - also known as the Myo family -) and Ashi Decho, daughter of Ashi Yeshay Choden (who was the sister of Druk Gyalpo Gongsar Ugyen Wangchuck).

She had two full-brothers and two full-sisters, and another half-siblings by the second marriages of her parents:

 Dasho Gonpo Dorji, Chumed Zhalgno. 
 Ashi Pema Dechen (1918–1991).
 Dasho Lam Nado (1920–1989).
 Ashi Chimi.

From an early age, Ashi Phuntsho Choden received a traditional education, including lessons on Buddhism. She received teachings, empowerment, and reading transmissions in the Drukpa Kargyu, Karma Kargyu, Dujom, Peling, and Nyingthig traditions from renowned Buddhist lamas.

Marriage and family
She married Bhutan's second king, a cross cousin, Jigme Wangchuck, in 1923 when she was 12 years old at Thinley Rabten Palace, Phodrang. They were second cousins. Ashi Phuntsho Choden was the half-sister of the maternal grandfather of the current Queen of Bhutan, Jetsun Pema, and she was the great grandmother of the Fifth Druk Gyalpo, Jigme Khesar Namgyel Wangchuck. She made sure that her only child, Druk Gyalsey Jigme Dorji Wangchuck, learned both English and Hindi in early childhood to prepare him for Bhutan's escalating involvement in foreign diplomacy.

Her younger sister, Ashi Pema Dechen (1918–1991), was the second wife of her husband since 1932 when she was 14 years old.

Royal duties
She was very religious. Phuntsho Choden played an important role in maintaining and strengthening Bhutan's rich Buddhist heritage. She built a legacy of religious institutions, established spiritual learning centres, and preserved the rich imagery that formed a core of Bhutan’s religious history.

She created the monument National Memorial Chorten in Thimphu which she built in memory of her son, His Majesty Jigme Dorji Wangchuck, for the well being of the nation and the people.

Death
She died on 24 August 2003 at Dechencholing Palace. Her body was ceremoniously laid out for 49 days and was taken to places she had been to when she was living.

Honours

  :
  King Jigme Singye Investiture Medal (2 June 1974).
  Commemorative Silver Jubilee Medal of King Jigme Singye (2 June 1999).

Ancestry

References

Notes

1911 births
2003 deaths
Bhutanese monarchy
20th-century Buddhist nuns
Buddhist nuns
Wangchuck dynasty
Queen mothers